Cyclone Qendresa, also known as Medicane Qendresa, was one of the most intense Mediterranean tropical-like cyclones on record, which struck Malta and the Italian island of Sicily in 2014. The storm formed on 5 November and rapidly intensified two days later, reaching peak intensity on 7 November, due to a cold-core low aloft. Qendresa directly hit Malta in the afternoon and then crossed the eastern coast of Sicily on 8 November. Later, the cyclone weakened significantly and dissipated over Crete on 11 November. Academic sources indicate that Qendresa transitioned into a subtropical cyclone, prior to reaching peak intensity. Qendresa caused three fatalities, and at least $250 million (2014 USD) in damages in Italy.

Meteorological history

A shortwave trough near the British Isles started to expand southwards to North Africa on 3 November, which caused Lake Maggiore in Italy to overflow. Although the Institute of Meteorology of the Free University of Berlin had assigned the name Qendresa to an expected low-pressure area developed within the trough on 4 November, it actually gave the name to two different systems on 5 November, resulting in Qendresa I to the south and Qendresa II to the north. On 6 November, the southern tip of Qendresa I started to develop a low-level circulation centre (LLCC) near Kerkennah Islands, and it is referred to simply as Qendresa later by most of the documents and reports. The trough also developed two upper-level circulation centres (ULCCs) on the same day— the one near the southeastern coast of France quickly dissipated, yet the one in Algeria moved to Tunisia and then entered the Strait of Sicily the next day, becoming a cut-off low from the trough.

When Qendresa's LLCC was moving north-northeastwards and combining with the ULCC early on 7 November, the system occluded quickly and intensified dramatically. Shortly before 17:00 CET (16:00 UTC), Qendresa directly hit Malta, around which time Qendresa lost its fronts and acquired a more well-defined eye. MOLOCH, an Italian model, estimated that the low-level temperature of Qendresa's eye was about  warmer than the surrounding area with the no longer cold middle and upper levels at that time, suggesting a warm-core system. Around this time, Qendresa was believed to have transitioned into a subtropical cyclone. Interacting with Sicily, the cyclone turned northeastwards and started to make an anticlockwise loop to the east of the Italian island. On 8 November, Qendresa tracked along the coast of Catania and crossed Syracuse in the morning. It was significantly eroded because of the terrain of Sicily and increasing vertical wind shear, resulting a partially exposed and weakening system later. On 9 November, Qendresa lost its cold front, and weakened into a non-tropical low, near the island of Crete. On 10 November, the system continued to decay, while moving over the island of Crete. On 11 November, Qendresa dissipated over Crete.

Impact

Malta experienced a direct hit similar to a typical tropical cyclone from Qendresa. Weather stations across other areas also recorded significant gusts from Qendresa. Qendresa drowned 3 people in Italy, and caused at least 250 million GBP (2014 EURO) in damages.

Qendresa caused chaos in Malta. Airport operations were suspended, and harbours were also closed. With many cars stalled in flooded streets throughout low-lying areas, the cyclone caused a traffic nightmare across the island. Power outages happened in several towns as electricity poles were brought down by strong winds; besides, many trees were uprooted. Qendresa brought similar damages to the eastern part of Sicily, including eroded coasts, blown off roofs, and overturned boats.

See also

Tropical Storm Rolf
Cyclone Numa
Cyclone Ianos
1996 Lake Huron cyclone

References

External links

The Birth and Death of Medicane Qendresa
Medicane Qendresa Hits Malta And Sicily 
Ciclone mediterraneo 7–8 novembre 2014  from YouReport.it 
Mediterranean Tropical Products Page – Satellite Services Division – Office of Satellite Data Processing and Distribution
Northeast Atlantic and Mediterranean Imagery – NOAA

Qendresa
2014 in Italy
2014 in Malta
2014 meteorology
2014 natural disasters
Weather events in Italy
Weather events in Malta
Extratropical cyclones
Subtropical cyclones
Qendresa
2014 disasters in Europe